(born 22 December 1977 in Kanagawa / grew up in Tatebayashi, Gunma) is a Japanese softball player at first base. She won a silver medal at the 2000 Summer Olympics, and a bronze medal in the 2004 Summer Olympics.

References

External links
 

1977 births
Japanese softball players
Living people
Olympic softball players of Japan
Olympic silver medalists for Japan
Olympic bronze medalists for Japan
Softball players at the 2000 Summer Olympics
Softball players at the 2004 Summer Olympics
Olympic medalists in softball
Asian Games medalists in softball
Softball players at the 2002 Asian Games
Medalists at the 2002 Asian Games
Asian Games gold medalists for Japan
Medalists at the 2004 Summer Olympics
Medalists at the 2000 Summer Olympics
20th-century Japanese women